Reza Heydari is a professional goalkeeper who is currently playing for  Naft Masjed Soleyman in Persian Gulf Pro League. He was used as the second goalkeeper but recently he was used for the starting goalie. He got a good reputation after a win over Foolad.

Club career

Foolad Yazd
His debut was a 0-0 with Gahar Zagros as a 19-year-old he got his first professional career Clean Sheet in Azadegan League. He played 19 league games with Foolad Yazd. He left Yazd Foolad in 2014.

Naft Masjed Soleyman
Starting his career with a 0-2 defeat against Esteghlal taking over Reza Mohammadi. He got the important 3 points for Naft Masjed Soleyman after a great 2-1 victory over Foolad.

References

1991 births
Living people
Iranian footballers
Association football goalkeepers
Foolad Yazd players
Fajr Sepasi players
Naft Masjed Soleyman F.C. players